The 1924–25 season was Blackpool F.C.'s 24th season (21st consecutive) in the Football League. They competed in the 22-team Division Two, then the second tier of English football, finishing seventeenth.

Harry Bedford was the club's top scorer for the fourth consecutive season, with 28 goals in total (24 in the league and four in the FA Cup).

Season synopsis
Four victories in their opening six League fixtures put the Seasiders in and around the top of the table for the first couple of weeks of the campaign; however, the wheels started to fall off from that point onwards. Ten further victories were offset by nineteen defeats, which left the club three points above the drop zone at the end of the season.

Their FA Cup journey ended in the fourth round, the only stage that they did not have to replay. It was the furthest they had ventured in the tournament to date.

Table

Transfers

In

Out

References

Blackpool F.C.
Blackpool F.C. seasons